Ot Serdtsa k Nebu (От Сердца к Небу) is the fourth full-length album by the Russian folk metal band Arkona. It was released on 31 October 2007 through Sound Age Production and later through Napalm Records. The name translates to "From the Heart to the Sky".

Reception

The album received a positive review from the Canadian Exclaim! magazine. The author noted the album's variations in tone and structure and wrote that Arkona had "achieved the harder task" of integrating hard modern sounds and traditional tunes. The German edition of Metal Hammer awarded 5 out of 7 points to the album. About.com wrote that singer Maria "Masha" Arkhipova was an "excellent vocalist" who was capable of performing both soft song and harsh screaming and growling with a high standard.

Track listing

References

2007 albums
Arkona (band) albums